The 1910 VMI Keydets football team represented the Virginia Military Institute (VMI) in their 20th season of organized football. The Keydets finished at 3–3–1 with second-year coach William Gloth.

Schedule

Game summaries

North Carolina

Norfolk Blues

William and Mary

Virginia

St. John's

Maryland

Georgetown

References

VMI
VMI Keydets football seasons
VMI Keydets football